Baitarani Road railway station is a railway station on the East Coast Railway network in the state of Odisha, India. It serves Baitarani Road. Its code is BTV. It has four platforms. Passenger, MEMU, Express trains halt at Baitarani Road railway station.

Major trains

 East Coast Express
 Santragachi–Paradeep Express

See also
 Jajpur district

References

Railway stations in Jajpur district
Khurda Road railway division